An osteria  (plural osterie) in Italy was originally a place serving wine and simple food. Lately, the emphasis has shifted to the food, but menus tend to be short, with the emphasis on local specialities such as pasta and grilled meat or fish, often served at shared tables. Osterie tend to be cheap, and they also focus on after work and evening refreshment. Osterie vary greatly in practice: some only serve drinks and clients are allowed to bring in their own food, and some have retained a predominantly male clientele whilst others have reached out to students and young professionals. Some provide music and other entertainment. Similar to osterie are bottiglierie, where customers can take a bottle or flask to be re-filled from a barrel, and enoteche which generally pride themselves on the range and quality of their wine. In Emilia-Romagna are located three of the oldest Italian osterie: "Osteria del Sole" and "Osteria del Cappello" in Bologna, and "Osteria al Brindisi" in Ferrara, established between the 14th and 15th century.

See also
 Trattoria

References

External links
 

Restaurants in Italy
Restaurants by type